The comparative ranks of Nazi Germany contrasts the ranks of the Wehrmacht to a number of national-socialist organisations in Nazi Germany from 1933 to 1945 in a synoptic table. Nazi organisations used a hierarchical structure, according to the so-called Führerprinzip (leader principle), and were oriented in line with the rank order system of the Wehrmacht.

Nazi rank structure in comparison to the Wehrmacht

Officer ranks

Enlisted

See also 
Comparative military ranks of World War II
Glossary of German military terms
Glossary of Nazi Germany
World War II German Army ranks and insignia

Notes

References

Citations

Bibliography

Further reading 
 Wolfgang Benz (editor): Wie wurde man Parteigenosse? Die NSDAP und ihre Mitglieder. Fischer-Taschenbuch-Verlag, Frankfurt am Main 2009,  (Fischer 18068 Die Zeit des Nationalsozialismus).
 

Wehrmacht
Sturmabteilung
Nazi SS
Nazi Party
Military comparisons